Radical 87 or radical claw meaning "claw", "nail" or "talon" is one of the 34 Kangxi radicals (214 radicals total) composed of 4 strokes.

In the Kangxi Dictionary there are 36 characters (out of 49,030) to be found under this radical.

 is also the 86th indexing component in the Table of Indexing Chinese Character Components predominantly adopted by Simplified Chinese dictionaries published in mainland China, with  being its associated indexing component.

Evolution

Derived characters

Variant forms
This difference may apply to both printing typefaces and handwriting forms, and usually both are acceptable.

The upper component form  also has variant forms in different regions. Traditionally, the second and fourth strokes point outwards in printing typefaces but point inwards in handwriting. Similar change were also adopted in Japanese jōyō kanji (commonly used Chinese characters), e.g.  -> , while the forms of kyūjitai and hyōgai kanji were left unchanged, e.g. (=), . In Taiwan, Hong Kong and Macau where Traditional Chinese is used,  is adopted as the standard form, though both forms are commonly used in publication.

Literature

External links

Unihan Database - U+722A

087
086